Kim Sun-ja may refer to:
 Kim Sun-ja (athlete)
 Kim Sun-ja (serial killer)